Ahmed Mohamed Ibrahim is a football player who played for the Egyptian team Al-Zamalek. He scored a goal during his first match with the team.

External links
KOOORA Profile

Year of birth missing (living people)
Living people
Egyptian footballers
Association football defenders
Zamalek SC players